Bismuth telluride is a gray powder that is a compound of bismuth and tellurium also known as bismuth(III) telluride. It is a semiconductor, which, when alloyed with antimony or selenium, is an efficient thermoelectric material for refrigeration or portable power generation.  is a topological insulator, and thus exhibits thickness-dependent physical properties.

Properties as a thermoelectric material
Bismuth telluride is a narrow-gap layered semiconductor with a trigonal unit cell. The valence and conduction band structure can be described as a many-ellipsoidal model with 6 constant-energy ellipsoids that are centered on the reflection planes.  cleaves easily along the trigonal axis due to Van der Waals bonding between neighboring tellurium atoms. Due to this, bismuth-telluride-based materials used for power generation or cooling applications must be polycrystalline. Furthermore, the Seebeck coefficient of bulk  becomes compensated around room temperature, forcing the materials used in power-generation devices to be an alloy of bismuth, antimony, tellurium, and selenium.

Recently, researchers have attempted to improve the efficiency of -based materials by creating structures where one or more dimensions are reduced, such as nanowires or thin films. In one such instance n-type bismuth telluride was shown to have an improved Seebeck coefficient (voltage per unit temperature difference) of −287 μV/K at 54 °C, However, one must realize that Seebeck coefficient and electrical conductivity have a tradeoff: a higher Seebeck coefficient results in decreased carrier concentration and decreased electrical conductivity.

In another case, researchers report that bismuth telluride has high electrical conductivity of 1.1×105 S·m/m2 with its very low lattice thermal conductivity of 1.20 W/(m·K), similar to ordinary glass.

Properties as a topological insulator
Bismuth telluride is a well-studied topological insulator. Its physical properties have been shown to change at highly reduced thicknesses, when its conducting surface states are exposed and isolated. These thin samples are obtained through either epitaxy or mechanical exfoliation.

Epitaxial growth methods such as molecular beam epitaxy and metal organic chemical vapor deposition are common methods of obtaining thin  samples. The stoichiometry of samples obtained through such techniques can vary greatly between experiments, so Raman spectroscopy is often used to determine relative purity. However, thin  samples are resistant to Raman spectroscopy due to their low melting point and poor heat dispersion.

The crystalline structure of  allows for mechanical exfoliation of thin samples by cleaving along the trigonal axis. This process is significantly lower in yield than epitaxial growth, but produces samples without defects or impurities. Similar to extracting graphene from bulk graphite samples, this is done by applying and removing adhesive tape from successively thinner samples. This procedure has been used to obtain  flakes with a thickness of 1 nm. However, this process can leave significant amounts of adhesive residue on a standard Si/SiO2 substrate, which in turn obscure atomic force microscopy measurements and inhibit the placement of contacts on the substrate for purposes of testing. Common cleaning techniques such as oxygen plasma, boiling acetone and isopropyl alcohol are ineffective in removing residue.

Occurrence and preparation

There are many natural bismuth tellurides of different stoichiometry, as well as compounds of the Bi-Te-S-(Se) system, like  (tetradymite).

Bismuth telluride may be prepared simply by sealing mixed powders of bismuth and tellurium metal in a quartz tube under vacuum (critical, as an unsealed or leaking sample may explode in a furnace) and heating it to 800 °C in a muffle furnace.

See also
Thermoelectric materials
Thermoelectric effect
Topological insulator

References

External links

Bismuth Telluride and its Alloys (Chapter 4.5 of Martin Wagner dissertation)
CDC – NIOSH Pocket Guide to Chemical Hazards – Bismuth Telluride, undoped

Bismuth compounds
Tellurides
Semiconductor materials
Thermoelectricity